Atyphella brevis is a species of firefly in the genus Atyphella.

References

Lampyridae
Bioluminescent insects
Beetles described in 1909